Education in Greece is centralized and governed by the Ministry of Education and Religious Affairs (Greek: , Υ.ΠΑΙ.Θ.) at all grade levels in elementary and middle school. The Ministry exercises control over public schools, formulates and implements legislation, administers the budget, coordinates national level university entrance examinations, sets up the national curriculum, appoints public school teaching staff, and coordinates other services. 

The Ministry of Education and Religious Affairs is also in charge of which classes are necessary for general education. They have implemented mandatory courses such as religion in required grade levels (1st-9th grades). Students can only be exempt if their guardians fill out a declaration excluding them from religious lessons.

The national supervisory role of the Ministry is exercised through Regional Unit Public Education Offices, which are named Regional Directorates of Primary and Secondary School Education. Public schools and their supply of textbooks are funded by the government. Public schools in Greece are tuition-free and students on a state approved list are provided textbooks at no cost.

About 25% of postgraduate programmes are tuition-fee, while about 30% of students are eligible to attend programmes tuition-free based on individual criteria. 

Formal education in Greece comprises three educational stages. The first stage of formal education is the primary stage, which lasts for six years starting at age of 6 and ending at the age of 12, followed by the secondary stage, which is separated into two sub-stages: the compulsory middle school, which lasts three years starting at age 12, and non-compulsory Lyceum, which lasts three years starting at 15. The third stage involves higher education.

School holidays in Greece include Christmas, Greek Independence Day, Easter, National Anniversary Day, a three-month summer holiday, National Public Holidays, and local holidays, which vary by region such as the local patron saint's day.

In addition to schooling, the majority of students attend extracurricular private classes at private tutoring centres called "frontistiria" (frontistirio), or one-to-one tuition. These centres prepare students for higher education admissions, like the Pan-Hellenic Examinations, and/or provide foreign language education.

It is forbidden by law for students to use mobile phones while on the school premises. Taking or making phone calls, texting, or the use of other camera, video or other recording devices or medium that have image and audio processing ability like smartwatches is forbidden. Students must switch off their mobile phones or set them to silent mode and keep them in their bags while on the school premises. However, especially at high schools, the use of mobile phones is widespread, especially at breaks and sometimes in the class.

Diagram

Preschool
 
Most preschools, also known as pre-primary, are attached to and share buildings with a primary school. Preschool is compulsory and lasts 2 years, split into 1 year of Pre-kindergarten (Προνηπιαγωγείο) and 1 year of Kindergarten (Νηπιαγωγείο; Nipiagogeio). Since the school year 2018–2019, children who would be four years of age by December 31 are required to begin attending preschool on September 11 of the same year. Applications for registration and enrolment are usually carried out annually during fifteen consecutive days in May. After this period expires, students are neither allowed to register nor enroll.
 1st Year / Pre-Kindergarten, age 4 to 5 years old (with some 3 year olds, about to turn 4, attending) 
 2nd Year / Kindergarten, age 5 to 6 (with some 4 year olds, about to turn 5, attending)

There are also the public Special Preschools and public Experimental Preschools

In these school years, students are given descriptive assessments instead of number/letter grades.

Foreign Language 
Students begin taking English as part of their core curriculum in kindergarten. It has been scientifically proven that until the age of 11 it is more likely to successfully become proficient in a foreign language than any older age. This may be the reason many countries in the European Union begin learning a foreign language, specifically English, at the age of 5.

Primary education

Primary school (Dimotiko scholeio) is compulsory for 6 years. There is also the public Special Primary and public Experimental Primary.  

The school year starts on September 11 and ends on June 15. The standard school day starts at 08:15 and finishes at 13:15. It comprises six academic years of schooling named τάξεις (grades), numbered 1 through to 6. Enrollment to the next tier of compulsory education, the Gymnasium, is automatic. The classes for a subject vary with the teacher who teaches. Students are awarded an "" (Apolytirio Dimotikou, primary school leaving certificate) which gives automatic admission to the lower secondary education (gymnasium).  

In Year 1 and Year 2, students are not officially graded. Beginning with years 3 and 4, grades are ranked alphabetically from A to D. From year 5, when written exams are introduced, to year 6 it changes to numbers, going from 4, the lowest, to 10 the highest (best).  

Αges are typical and can vary with the most common ages approximately: 
 

 Grades of Primary School
Grade 1–6 
 1st Year / First grade, age 6 to 7-year-olds
 2nd Year / Second grade, age 7 to 8
 3rd Year / Third grade, age 8 to 9
 4th Year / Fourth grade, age 9 to 10
 5th Year / Fifth grade, age 10 to 11
 6th Year / Sixth grade, age 11 to 12

 Grading System 

 1st Year: no grade points
 2nd Year: no grade points 
 3rd Year: Α–Δ (A–D)
 4th Year: Α–Δ (A–D)
 5th Year: 1–10
 6th Year: 1–10 

Primary School National Curriculum

Secondary education

Lower Secondary Education
Gymnasium (Gymnasio, Lower Secondary Education School, middle school) is compulsory until the age of 15.

Article 16, Paragraph 3 of the Constitution of 1975 mandates that compulsory education must be at least nine years in length. 
This constitutional provision, which applies to all Greek children, was established in Law 309/1976, which also replaced classical Greek (katharevousa) with modern Greek (dimotiki) as the official language for teaching at all levels of education, and ceased to be a one-tier non-compulsory six years lower and upper secondary school, middle schools (pupils aged 12–18), and was converted to compulsory three-year lower secondary school for students aged 12–15 (middle school) and three-year non-compulsory upper secondary schools for students aged 15–18 (high school).

Admitted students can be up to 16-years-old, and they must have Primary Education School Certificate or its international equivalent. No entry exams are required. Schooling starts on September 11 and ends on early June before the first day of the Pan-Hellenic Examinations. The lessons end on May 31 so that the students will be able to study for their examinations in early June. The gymnasium school-awarded qualification "" (Apolytirio Gymnasium, gymnasium school leaving certificate, referred to simply as gymnasium certificate) at HQF (NQF) level 3, gives admission to the upper secondary education (lyceum). Gymnasium has three academic years of schooling known as "" (grade), numbered 1 through to 3. Ages are typical and can vary with the most common being between:
 1st Year / First grade, age 12 to 13-year-olds
 2nd Year / Second grade, age 13 to 14 
 3rd Year / Third grade, age 14 to 15

The types of gymnasium in Greece are:
 
 Middle school
 Special Middle school
 Evening Middle school
 Ecclesiastical Middle school
 Middle school of Cross-Cultural Education
 Model Middle school (public; to enter, students must pass certain written examinations) 
 Experimental Middle school (public; students are selected randomly) 
 Integrated Special Vocational Middle school-High school (4 years for the Middle school)
 Music Middle school (to enter this type of school students must pass certain musical exams) 
 Art Middle school (to enter this type of school students must pass certain exams on either arts, dance, or theater; 2004–Present)

Gymnasium National Curriculum 

In junior high school English is mandatory all three years, while students can choose between French or German as the second foreign language that's required.

Second Chance Adult School
Second Chance Adult School (SDE) is a Gymnasium level equivalent evening school administrated by Ministry of Education, for adults who do not have complete the lower secondary education (gymnasium) lasts two-year with 25 hours per week.

Upper Secondary Education
Upper secondary school (Lykeio, Upper Secondary Education School, Lyceum, High School: the US term for upper secondary school) is non-compulsory education lasting 3 years.

High schools starts on September 11 and ends on June 15. Lessons end in late May so that the students will be able to study for their examinations in June. Admitted students can be up to 20-year-old, while they must have Gymnasium Certificate or Lower Secondary Education School Certificate or its international equivalent. The Evening Lyceum is for both adult students and underage working students lasts 3 years. After having completed the 3rd grade, the graduates of the Lyceum are awarded the "" qualification (Apolytirio Lykeiou, Lyceum Apolytirio, upper secondary leaving certificate, high school diploma, referred to simply as lyceum certificate) at HQF(NQF) / EQF level 4, at ISCED level 3. The marking scale on the Apolytirio Lykeiou (GPA) is set to a 20-point grading system, law 4610/2019. The Lyceum Apolytirio is required for admission to Higher Education and to continue studies, and is an equivalent in level to the GCE Advanced Level.  

Students wishing to access study programmes in Higher Education must be both secondary education school graduates (lyceum or its equivalent) holding Apolytirio Lykeiou (lyceum certificate or its equivalent) and must take nationally set examinations officially entitled "Πανελλαδικές Εξετάσεις" (Pan-Hellenic Examinations, Panelladikes Eksetaseis) which is an externally assessed national standardized test (university matriculation examinations) given one time in any given school year, which also accept all adult ages for candidates. Apolytirio certificate grants the right to pursue entry to higher education at a later date by participating at the Pan-Hellenic Examinations. Ministry of Education bears the responsibility for the central organization of these matriculation examinations. Candidates exam in 4 subjects that have selected from the 3rd grade of lyceum, while different numerical value titled "συντελεστής βαρύτητας" (coefficient weight) has assigned to each of those subjects contributes differently towards the overall score.

Successful admission is determined through the combination of a) "", literally "the access score", that is the candidate's weighted average of the grades achieved in examinations, b) the candidate's "" Β.Π.Α. represents the student's sum of all three Grade Point Average (GPA) earned in 1st, 2nd, 3rd Grade of lyceum each of these is multiplied by a given coefficient weight where the result is divided by two, Β.Π.Α. = (1st Grade GPA × 0.4 + 2nd Grade GPA × 0.7 + 3rd Grade GPA × 0.9) / 2, c) the candidate's "" (michanografiko deltio, application form) in which it states its preferences for the higher education institutions by priority order, d) the available number of places allocated in each academic department. The number of students that are admitted for each programme is determined annually by the Ministry of Education. As there are usually more applicants than places available in certain fields of study, students with the highest average exam results are selected, e) For admission to programmes requiring specialized knowledge or skills, special admission examinations are require in one or more certain subjects (such as fine arts, architecture, music studies, foreign languages, and others) or compulsory preparatory tests (such as medical assessment, fitness, sports, psychometric). "" (Vevaiosi Prosvasis, Access to Higher Education Certificate) is a document given to students soon after Pan-Hellenic Examinations results are released.

High schools in Greece designate school class levels based on the years of schooling of the student cohort, using 3 academic year levels, known as "" (grade), numbered 1 through to 3. Ages are typical and can vary with the most common being are between:  
 1st Year / First grade, age 15 to 16-year-olds
 2nd Year / Second grade, age 16 to 17
 3rd Year / Third grade, age 17 to 18
In high school English is also required all three years as part of general education courses, whereas secondary foreign languages like French or German are optional.

The grading system in upper secondary schools is extended from 1 to 20 as opposed to 10 in middle school. The score of 20 is the equivalent to an A or 100 in the U.S. 

The types of high schools (Λύκειο) in Greece are:
 
  (Eidiko Lykeio; Special Lyceum)
  (Mousiko Lykeio; Music Lyceum; 1988–Present)(to enter, students must pass certain exams on a musical instrument)
  (Protipo Lykeio; Model Lyceum [public]; 2015–Present)(to enter, students must pass certain written examinations) 
  (Kalitexniko Lykeio; Art Lyceum; 2006–Present)(to enter, students must pass certain exams on either arts, dance, or theater)
  (ΓΕΛ; Geniko Lykeio; General Lyceum; 1976–1996, 2006–Present)
  (Peiramatiko Lykeio; Experimental Lyceum [public]; 2015–Present)(to enter, students must pass certain written examinations) 
  i.e. comprehensive lyceum type; Diapolitismiko Lykeio; General Lyceum of Cross-Cultural Education; 2018–Present)
  Epagelmatiko Lykeio; Vocational Lyceum; EPAL; 2006–Present)
  (Esperino Epagelmatiko Lykeio; Evening Vocational Lyceum)
  (Esperino Geniko Lykeio; Evening General Lyceum; 1976–Present)
  Ekklisiastiko Lykeio; Ecclesiastical General Lyceum; 2006–Present)
  Integrated Special Vocational Gymnasium-Lyceum; 4 years for the lyceum)

General High Schools
General High Schools ( Geniko Lykeio).

It awarded "" (Apolytirio Genikou Lykeiou, General High School Apolytirio, General High School Certificate, Upper Secondary Leaving Certificate, General High School Diploma). It can be awarded in Orientation Groups requiring an advanced level in a number of four different subjects (advanced level subjects, or also known as high level subjects), depending on the group. The second-grade students must choose one out of the two academic tracks named "" (Orientation Groups), and the third-grade students one out of the three Orientation Groups. The Orientation Group is also known as Stream. Once it has selected a Stream it needs to follow a sequence of subjects to complete it. If they wish, graduating students are eligible to exam in Pan-Hellenic Examinations on four subjects of their chosen third-grade Orientation Group.

Vocational High Schools (EPAL)
Vocational High School (EPAL;  Epagelmatiko Lykeio).
EPAL programme of study is designed in relation to the European Credit System for Vocational Education and Training (ECVET) and International Standard Classification of Occupations (ISCO).
  
The EPAL has dual-diploma (also known as double-diploma)  studies comprises two separate programmes taken in parallel earning, both, two separate qualifications in their own right, a "" (Apolytirio Epagelmatikou Lykeiou; Vocational High School Apolytirio; Vocational High School Diploma; i.e. Diploma of Vocational Education and Training at HQF (NQF) level 4; also is called Specialization Diploma or Specialized Diploma). EPAL High School Diploma can be awarded in Orientation Groups (specializations or streams) requiring an advanced level in a number of four different subjects (advanced level subjects, or also known as high level subjects), depending on the group. 

The Grade 2 students must choose one of nine Orientation Groups, also known as "" sectors (penultimate year). The Grade 3 students must choose one of varying specializations (or specialties) titled "" (final year, specialties corresponding those orientation groups offered in Grade 2). The chosen orientation group at the Grade 2 it is cannot switch at Grade 3. The Grade 2 subjects contributes only to the half of a full Grade 3 Specialty, and do not constitute a separate qualification. Until a maximum age up to 20-year-old lyceum graduates are exempted from all core subjects from Grades 2 and 3 of the EPAL High School and they can be directly admitted to EPAL Grade 2, meaning these students when will graduate, it will only be awarded EPAL Specialization Diploma.

EPAL High School Diploma is required for admission to Higher Education Institutes (HEIs) and to continue studies, and is an equivalent in level to the GCE Advanced Level. Students normally select their chosen Specialty in fields relevant to intended study at the higher education, and in Pan-Hellenic Examinations, if they wish, exam in 4 advanced level subjects of the Grade 3.

 is transliterated to "Ptychio" (Ptychio in dhimotiki from 1976–present; or defunct ; Ptychion in polytonic, katharevousa up until 1976). The Greek word "" has translation into English as "Degree", it is a qualification term has common meaning in Greece. It signifies that it is a direct translation from the terminology in Greek as it appears in the Greek legislation. In Greece, the word "" is commonly used for titles of study from different education levels (secondary, higher etc.). It must not confuse with its usage in the English language, whereby the word Degree refers to Higher Education qualification title only. Greece Universities' Degree is titled "", transliterated to "Ptychio", signifies that it is a University Ptychio, Higher Education Ptychio, Level 6 Ptychio. EPAL Diploma of Vocational Education and Training at HQF level 4 standalone parchment is an Upper Secondary Education Ptychio, Level 4 Ptychio.
 
EPAL graduates have the option to choose Post-High School Year Apprenticeship Class ("Mathitia") by which it can upgrade the EPAL Diploma of Vocational Education and Training at HQF level 4 (Level 4 Ptychio) to Level 5. During the year, the students are working for 4 days in a workplace receiving stipend and attend 1 day at school classes. Since 2021–2022 academic year, the Post-High School Year Apprenticeship Class graduates having Diploma of Vocational Education and Training at level 5, after successful specific entrance examinations, allows to them admission into the Higher Education (level 6) to an undergraduate programme relevant to their Post-High School Year Apprenticeship Class specialty.

Vocational School (EPAS) of DYPA 
The Vocational School (EPAS) ( 1952–Present) of Public Employment Service (DYPA) is 2 years' duration. Also known as Apprenticeship Vocational School (Epaggelmatiki Sxoli Mathitias), shortened to EPAS Apprenticeship. Since 2021, EPAS Apprenticeship is a lower secondary two-track education system, Dual VET, having alternating periods in a school with theory classroom and at the workplace with work-(traineeship) practice experience, with terms are contractually regulated by law and labour agreement. Balance between school-and work-based training: in-company (ca. 70%) + school (ca. 30%). Student insurance and two-part agreement between the student and apprenticeship company are applied. Generally, the maximum number of students that can register in a given education programme is up to 20. Apprenticeship is based on the German dual learning system which combines classroom education with paid practical work in a business. EPAS Apprenticeship is operated by Public Employment Service (DYPA). The EPAS Apprenticeship provides its students in having an apprenticeship term work placement by finding and coordinating it. Students are entitled to receive at least the national minimum wage for their age. The majority of these students are classed as unskilled workers (entry-level). Admitted students are aged from 15 to 23-year-old maximum who must have completed the gymnasium school. The EPAS Apprenticeship awarded "" (Ptychio of Vocational Education and Training, Level 3; i.e. Diploma of Vocational Education and Training at Level 3) after qualifying examinations of the National Accreditation Examinations will be held at EOPPEP examination centers.

Experimental Vocational School (PEPAS) of DYPA
The Experimental Vocational School (PEPAS; Greek:  2021–Present), is also known as Experimental Vocational Apprenticeship School, founded in 2021 by Public Employment Service (DYPA) in collaboration with German-Hellenic Chamber of Industry and Commerce and Institute of the Greek Tourism Confederation (INSETE). Eligible to apply are those aged 18 years old and over, holders of at least a lower secondary school leaving certificate (gymnasium) and have a verified knowledge of a foreign language (English or French or German) at level B2 in both written and spoken by holding a valid formal certificate. As of 2021–2022 school year, there are provide the specialities Culinary Art Technician (cook), Food & Beverage Service, Customer Service in the Tourism Business.

The grading system in upper secondary schools is extended from 1 to 20 as opposed to 10 in middle school. The score of 20 is the equivalent to an A or 100 in the U.S.

Post-lyceum Year Apprenticeship Class of EPAL
Post-lyceum Year Apprenticeship Class ( 2016–Present) is provided by Vocational Lyceum (ΕPΑL). Only EPAL graduates and Lyceum graduates hold EPAL Diploma of Vocational Education and Training at HQF level 4 are admitted to Post-lyceum Year Apprenticeship Class being regarded as a separate and distinctive stage of post-secondary education (i.e. ). It includes 1 year post-secondary apprenticeship dual programme (non-tertiary; Dual VET two-track education system) having alternating periods in an EPAL school unit with classroom instruction (theory 1 day/week, 7 hrs per day) and at the workplace with work practice training (4 days/week, 7 hrs per day). All apprenticeships schemes should include a contract (i.e. ), wage and social security rights/benefits to student which is a trainee referred to simply as "apprentice". EPAL Apprenticeship Class programmes are based on Public Employment Service (DYPA) at its dual learning principle and follow the same quality framework for apprenticeships. Graduates of the apprenticeship class will receive "" (Certificate of Post-High School Year Apprenticeship Class).

If they wish the Apprenticeship Class graduates are therefore eligible to take the National Accreditation Examinations (i.e. ) will be held at EOPPEP examination centers. Once, they have been passed all examinations then are awarded "" (Ptychio of Vocational Education and Training, Level 5; i.e. Diploma of Vocational Education and Training at Level 5). With the law 4763/2020 the Post-High School Year Apprenticeship Class graduates having Diploma of Vocational Education and Training at Level 5, after successful specific entrance examinations, allows to them admission into the Higher Education (level 6) to an undergraduate programme relevant to their Post-High School Year Apprenticeship Class specialty.

Vocational Lyceum (EPAL)
Vocational Lyceum 3 years (EPAL;  2006–Present)

Laboratory of Special Vocational Education (ΕΕΕΕΚ)
Laboratory of Special Vocational Education, 6 years special education at HQF Level 2

Public Schools of Tourism Education
Public Schools of Tourism Education are operated by Ministry of Tourism. Types are the 1.) Schools of Tourist Guides, 2.) Further-training Programmes of Employees in Tourism Sector (non-formal education), 3.) Institutes of Vocational Training (IEKs). The IEKs comprise the specialties of: Culinary Art (cookery); Bakery and Pastry (baker and pâtissier); Tourism Units and Hospitality Businesses (front office / reception, floor service / housekeeping, commodity education); Specialist of Business Administration and Economics in the Tourism Field.

School of Meat Professions (SEK)
Α School of Meat Professions (SEK;  1977–Present) is accredited by the Ministry of Rural Development and Food. There are public and private schools of meat professions. The 300 hours programme has 85 hours theory classes at school and 100 hours laboratory classes (ca. 61.6%), 15 hours educational visits (ca. 5%), 100 hours in-company work-based training (internship, ca. 33.3%). The term is 5 hours per day, 5 days per week, for 12 consecutive weeks. The specialties of the School of Meat Professions are, Meat Processing Technician (meat cutter, butcher, Greek: κρεοπώλης), Animal Slaughter (Greek: εκδοροσφαγέας).

Vocational Training Schools (ESK)
Vocational Training Schools (ESK;) is 2-year post-gymnasium vocational education and training school at HQF level 3. Admitted students must have completed the gymnasium school. It can be public, private, day or evening school. It awarded "" (Ptychio of Vocational Education and Training, Level 3; i.e. Diploma of Vocational Education and Training at HQF level 3) after qualifying examinations of the National Accreditation Examinations will be held at EOPPEP examination centers.

Laboratory Centre (ΕΚ)
Laboratory Centre ( 2013–Present), 3 years secondary education. Admitted students must have completed at least the lower secondary education school (gymnasium or its equivalent). Awarded "" (literally "Certificate of Vocational Training"). Awarded "" (Ptychio of Vocational Education and Training, Level 3; i.e. Diploma of Vocational Education and Training at HQF level 3) after qualifying examinations of the National Accreditation Examinations will be held at EOPPEP examination centers.

Institute of Vocational Training (IEK)
 
Institute of Vocational Training (I.E.K.;  1992–Present), is 2 years adult post-secondary vocational education and training and 960 hours at a work placement (experiential learning, practicum). Admitted students must have completed at least the upper secondary education (lyceum). EOPPEP organization is the statutory body for the IEKs. The IEK awarded "" (Diploma of Vocational Education and Training, Level 5) after qualifying examinations of the National Accreditation Examinations will be held at EOPPEP examination centers. See a list of IEK study programmes which is set out below, click on the "[show]":

Tertiary education in Greece
 

Higher education, also called tertiary, third stage, provided by Higher Educational Institutes (HEIs;) and consist of Universities and specialist Academies, which primarily cater to the military. They are mostly autonomous, but the government is responsible for their funding and the distribution of students to undergraduate programmes. Higher Education Institutions in Greece are public universities and can be attended without charge of a tuition fee, textbooks, and for the majority of students meals are also provided for free. About 25% of postgraduate programmes have free tuition, while about 30% of students are eligible to attend programmes tuition-free based on individual criteria. Each academic year is 32 weeks study programme, divided into two semesters of 16 weeks each.

Among the Greek universities offer English-taught full-time programmes with tuition are: National and Kapodistrian University of Athens (NKUA) 4-year undergraduate programme in Archaeology, History, and Literature of Ancient Greece, Aristotle University of Thessaloniki (AUTh) School of Medicine 6-year undergraduate programme for foreign citizens, University of Piraeus, School of Economics, Business and International Studies, Department of International and European Studies, postgraduate programme titled Master of Science (MSc) American Studies: Politics, Strategy and Economics, also the University Center of International Programmes of Studies (UCIPS) of the public International Hellenic University (IHU) offers English-taught postgraduate programmes.

According to the article 16 of the Greek constitution, private tertiary education is not allowed in Greece, and the government only recognizes the degree programmes offered by the public universities. In Greece, private colleges are Post-secondary Education Centres at non-formal education level operate under the proper registration accredited by the Ministry of Education.  

Usually, most private colleges have been authorised to offer foreign undergraduate and postgraduate programmes following franchise or validation agreements with collaborating universities established in other countries, primarily in the UK, leading to degrees awarded directly by those foreign universities.

Non-formal education
The formal education system includes the primary, secondary and higher education. The bodies of "non-typical education" term (φορείς μη τυπικής εκπαίδευσης) are outside the formal education system, referred to as non-formal education, the well-known include:
 The Citizens' Digital Academy from Ministry of Digital Governance, which has been set in English as National Digital Academy, has launched in May 2020, provides freely online training seminars (webinars) to the public for registered online participants, in the categories of Communication and Cooperation, Internet, Tools for Daily Use, Digital Entrepreneurship, Computer Science, Cutting-edge Technologies. The website includes also the Digital Competence Self-Assessment Tool on the current digital competence level based on the three fundamental elements (knowledge, skills and attitudes) to get a reliable self-testing if and where it needs improving, based on the 2020 Digital Skills Index (DSI) and on the European DigComp Framework, version 2.1.
 The Institute of the Greek Tourism Confederation (INSETE) provides freely online webinar series and freely online educational seminars to the public for registered online participants where there are specialty sectors and each sector comprises  a number of seminars. A Certificate of Attendance in a sector will be given to those registered participants who attended 70% of the total hours of a sector. Sectors include: Hospitality Operations, Hospitality Sales & Marketing, Food & Beverage, Culinary Arts, Personal Development, Leadership and Management, Human Recourses Management.  
 Biomedical Research and Education Special Unit (BRESU), School of Medicine of the Aristotle University of Thessaloniki, provides freely online courses to the public for registered online participants via an online platform of a type MOOCs (Massive Open Online Courses). A Certificate of Attendance will be given to those registered participants who attended a course. 
 Centre of Continuing Education and Lifelong Learning (KEDIVIM;). 
 Post-secondary Education Centre to which the Private Colleges belong.

Other education
 National Centre for Public Administration and Local Government (EKDDA) (1983) which is the strategic agency of Greece for the training and education of public servants and Local Government employees. It is supervised by the Minister of Interior.

HQF levels
The National Qualification Framework (NQF) of Greece is officially named Hellenic Qualification Framework (HQF;) has an 8-level framework that unites non-formal and formal qualifications aligned to the appropriate levels from the National Organization for the Certification of Qualifications and Vocational Guidance (EOPPEP;) and for qualifications granted by Higher Education Institutes (HEIs) in according to the Hellenic (National) Authority for Higher Education (HAHE;). The HQF is linked to the European Qualifications Framework (EQF) and to the Qualifications Framework in the European Higher Education Area (QF-EHEA). The HQF is the Greek Register of Regulated Qualifications provides information for the accredited awarding bodies and the regulated qualifications of study (officially recognized) in Greece. The learning-outcomes-based qualification frameworks level systems of HQF, EQF, ISCED have reference levels classify the learning outcomes into reflection of study load (the number of credit points), knowledge, skills, grant equal professional rights of level, attainment covering formal and non-formal education recognized programmes which are designed within a national context and to make grades more comparable in an international context. See a list of HQF levels which is set out below, click on the "[show]":

Former education schools

Education schools are defunct after either closure or replacement, for example:

Secondary Vocational Schools of Ministry of Education (Υ.ΠΑΙ.Θ.):
 (ΕΠΑΣ; Vocational School; 2 years; Law 3475/2006; 2006–2013) 25 hours/week. Only subjects of specialization. Admitted students must have completed at least the first grade of the upper secondary education school (lyceum). Awarded Specialization Diploma.
  (ΣΕΚ; Schooled Vocational Training Centre; SEK; 3 years, 1986–2013)
  (ΤΕΣ; Technical Vocational School; 2 years; Law 576/1977; 1977–1998) 70% subjects of specialization and 30% subjects of general education. Admitted students must have completed at least the final year of the lower secondary education school (gymnasium graduates or its equivalent). Awarded Specialization Diploma.
Higher Education Institutes of Ministry of Education:
  (ΤΕΙ; Technological Educational Institute;  years 1983–1995, 4 years 1995–2019, 1983–2019)
Varied Schools:
  (ΣΤΕ; Schools of Tourism Education; Law 2387/2000; 2000–2003)
  (ΣΤΕ; Schools of Tourism Professions; Law 567/1937; 1937–2000)
  (ΛΕΝ; Merchant Navy Lyceum; 3 years; by Ministry of Mercantile Marine; –1998)
  (ΚΕΚ; Vocational Training Centres; replaced by KEDIVIM of type 2, 1990–2012)
  (ΚΑΤΕ; Centers for Higher Technical Education; Law 652/1970; 1970–1977)
  (Public Technical Schools of Assistant Engineers; 4 years, 1959–1966)
 , του ΟΤΕΚ (ΙΕΚ; Institute of Vocational Training; by ΟΤΕΚ; Law 3105/2003; 2003–2013)
  (ΚΕΤΕ; Centres of Vocational and Technical Education; 2 years secondary education)
  (ΕΕΣ; Centres of Liberal Studies; Legislative Decree 9/9-10-1935; replaced by KEDIVIM of type 1; 1935–2012)
  (ΚΑΤΕΕ; Centers for Higher Technical-Vocational Education; Law 576/1977; 1977–1983)
 , του ΟΤΕΚ (Vocational School; by Organization of Tourism Education and Training [ΟΤΕΚ]; Law 3105/2003; 2003–2013)  
  (KEDIVIM of type 1, KEDIVIM of type 2; replaced by KEDIVIM; 2012–2020)

Lyceums of Ministry of Education:
  (Athletic Lyceum; 3 years)
  (Integrated Lyceum; 3 years, 1997–2006)
  (Classic Lyceum; 3 years; Law 1566/1985; 1985 –1997)
  (Technical Lyceum; 3 years; Law 576/1977; 1977–1985) 
  (Vocational Lyceum; 3 years; Law 576/1977; 1977–1985)
  (Nautical Lyceum; 3 years; Law 309/1976; 1976–1985)
  (Integrated Multifarious Lyceum; 3 years; Law 1566/1985; 1985–1997)

  (Six-Grade Gymnasium; integrated 3 years lower and 3 years upper secondary school)
  (ΤΕΕ; Technical Vocational Training Centre; 3 years; Law 2640/1998; 1998–2006)
  (Technical Vocational Lyceum; 3 years; Law 1566/1985, Government Gazette 167/A/30-9-1985, 1985–1998) awarded upper secondary leaving certificate titled "", Technical Vocational Lyceum Ptychio (Level 4), i.e. Technical Vocational Lyceum Diploma was one (double) qualification has both an Apolytirio and a Specialization Diploma, 34 hours/week, i.e. High School Diploma comprising core curriculum and tech-vocational curriculum subjects awarded one parchment with both curricula listed.

Criticism and controversies 
 
 Corruption in Greece in public sector has the first place of all EU countries, and is the most corrupt country in the European Union, a survey revealed in 2012. The Greek public schools lack a human resource development, having huge corruption at all education levels according to the Global Corruption Barometer. According to the 2020 Corruption Perceptions Index reported by Transparency International, Greece is the 59th least corrupt country out of the 180 countries worldwide, scored 50% corruption out of 100%, of the perceived level of public level corruption on a scale of 0 (highly corrupt) to 100 (clear).
 Accounts of reports of the Greece National Transparency Authority (EAD; formerly Inspectors-Controllers Body for Public Administration; SEEDD) show criminal offences, complaints, lawsuits and criminal prosecutions are against public school educators and directors were found to commit violations; using profane, obscene, or ethnically offensive language; organized crime activities; copyright infringement; fraud; personal data theft; use of handphone and other unauthorised electronic and mobile devices during curriculum time; sexual abuse assault from students and educators; corruption; forgery; extortion; illegal fees; embezzlement of school funds; bullying.
 Greece was controversial for its legal disciplinary measure of school corporal punishment because was widely used and allowed in public schools, performed by school educators under the Principal's express authority, until it was banned in 1998 at primary schools and in 2005 at secondary schools. The physical punishment took place in front of all students consisted in the form of caning the buttocks of a student with a paddle or strap, caning on the palm of the hand with a wood stick, hitting a student's face, expulsion set in the school outdoor courtyard in the cold winter.
Since 30 July 2010, an official investigation on the criminal conspiracy theft began from the EU Council of the EU Charter of Fundamental Rights and European Convention on Human Rights.
 One out of the three public school students in Greece have received physical violation and abuse include verbal at 56.5 percent, followed by physical abuse at a rate of 30.5 percent and the threat of social exclusion at 27.8 percent. Greece ranks 4th place of student bullying amongst Europe countries according to the 1st European Anti-Bullying Network Conference, "Bullying and Cyberbullying Across Europe", Conference Proceedings, Athens, 2015 EAN. 
 Offences and corruption committed by highly rank or wealth persons holding public education school positions are rarely properly and transparently prosecuted.
 The tuition fee requirement from the most Greek Higher Education Institutes (HEIs) postgraduate programmes is contrary and entirely violating the Constitution of Greece, that all Greek citizens (and certain foreigners who live and work in the country) are entitled to free education on all levels at state educational institutions. The same violation act was done from the founding (law 2009/1992) of the Institutes of Vocational Training (IEKs) where all public IEK students were required to pay up to €367 statute fee for every semester up until the 2012–2013 academic year, that has been repealed since 2013–2014 academic year (article 22, law 4186/2013). 
 Statistically, at public education schools and public universities, mostly at vocational lyceums, are taking place accidents, illegal and criminal acts, violation incidents against, and from, students, although at private schools have occurred too.

See also

 Latin honors
 Educational stage
 Academic grading in Greece
 Education in ancient Greece
 Open access to scholarly communication in Greece

References

Further reading

External links
  
  Greek School Network    
     
   via eTranslation Digital Europe Programme   

Education in Greece
Education in Europe by country
Education by continent